The 2013 Six Nations Under 20s Championship was a rugby union competition held between February and March 2013. England won the tournament.

Final table

Results

Round one

Round two

Round three

Round four

Round five

References

2013
2013 rugby union tournaments for national teams
2012–13 in English rugby union
2012–13 in French rugby union
2012–13 in Irish rugby union
2012–13 in Welsh rugby union
2012–13 in Scottish rugby union
2012–13 in Italian rugby union
U-20
February 2013 sports events in Europe
March 2013 sports events in Europe